V Air was a Taiwanese low-cost airline based in Taipei active from 2014 through 2016. It was a franchise subsidiary of TransAsia Airways serving flights to Japan, South Korea, Thailand and Cambodia from its base at Taiwan Taoyuan International Airport.

History
On 24 March 2014, V Air announced that its corporate identity would be the Formosan black bear. The airline commenced services on 17 December 2014 with its maiden flight from Taipei to Bangkok, Thailand. On 7 January 2015, a second route, to Chiang Mai, Thailand, was launched. On 10 April 2015, V air opened its third scheduled flight route to Macau. The airline also flew from Taipei to Manila, Philippines, but the service was soon discontinued due to strong competition on the Taipei - Manila sector. V Air offered Taiwanese cuisine and beverage for sale on its flights.

Citing harsh competition and a revamped business model, V Air announced in August 2016 that it would cease all operations on 1 October 2016 and be folded back to its parent company TransAsia Airways, which itself declared bankruptcy 1 month later.

Destinations
As of September 2016, V Air served the following scheduled and charter destinations:

Fleet 

At the time the airline ceased operations, the V Air fleet consisted of the following aircraft:

References

External links

Official website

Defunct airlines of Taiwan
Airlines established in 2014
Airlines disestablished in 2016
Taiwanese companies established in 2014
2016 disestablishments in Taiwan
TransAsia Airways